A portico is a porch leading to the entrance of a building with a roof structure over a walkway.  

Buildings named after their porticos include:

 Santa Maria in Campitelli, in Rome, called Santa Maria in Portico
 Porticus Aemilia, in Rome, is an ancient structure near the river Tiber
 Porticus Octaviae, in Rome, is an ancient structure near the old Roman Jewish Ghetto

Portico may also refer to:

 Portico, an imprint of Anova Books
 Portico Library, in England
 The Portico, a literary journal
 Portico (band), a jazz group from London, formerly named Portico Quartet
 Portico (service), a digital archive by Ithaka Harbors
 Portico, a deep water cargo terminal located within Portsmouth International Port, UK
 Portico (video game)